The International Rugby Board (IRB) awarded the 2007 Under 19 Rugby World Championship to the Irish Rugby Football Union (IRFU) and the Ulster branch hosted it. The Tournament, which took place in Belfast, Northern Ireland from 4–21 April, was split into two divisions of twelve teams. Division A games took place in Belfast at Belfast Harlequins' Deramore Park, Ulster Rugby's Ravenhill Stadium, and Cooke RFC/Instonians' Shaw's Bridge complex. Division B games were held in Queen's University of Belfast's The Dub complex and Malone RFC's Gibson Park in Belfast, and Bangor RFC's Upritchard Park in Bangor.

Defending champion and top seed Australia began its title defence against Ireland on 5 April as part of a Round One double-header at Ravenhill that also included number three seed New Zealand against France.

The seedings of all teams in Division A and the top six teams in Division B were based on the final standings at the 2006 Tournament. Seeds 7 – 12 inclusive in Division B represented teams who had qualified for 2007 via regional tournaments and their seeding was drawn randomly. All 24 participating teams were confirmed in January 2007.

This was the final Under 19 World Championship. The IRB decided to fold its under-19 and under-21 world championships into a two-tiered under-20 tournament structure starting in 2008. The top tier, the IRB Junior World Championship, will feature 16 teams, while eight teams will compete in the second-tier IRB Junior World Trophy.

Qualification
The following 24 teams, shown by region, qualified for the 2007 Under 19 Rugby World Championship .

Match officials

Referees
These were chosen to Officiate at the 2007 Under 19 Rugby World Championship in Belfast, Northern Ireland from 4–21 April.

James Bolabiu (Fiji)
Phillip Bosch (South Africa)
Sarah Corrigan (Australia)
Alan Falzone (Italy)
Jérôme Garcès (France)
James Jones (Wales)
David Keane (Ireland)
Javier Mancuso (Argentina)
João Mourinha (Portugal)
Neil Paterson (Scotland)
Julian Pritchard (Australia)
Dean Richards (England)
Phil Smith (Canada)
Matt Stanish (New Zealand)

Touch judge panel
Peter Ferguson (Ireland)
Richard Kerr (Ireland)
Kyosuke Toda (Japan)
Laifaga Unasa (Samoa)

Sarah Corrigan the Australian match official created history when she took charge of the Division B match between Zimbabwe v Canada on 4 April 2007, becoming the first female to referee at an IRB 15-man tournament outside the Women's Rugby World Cup. (The first woman ever to officiate at any IRB tournament outside the Women's Rugby World Cup was American Dana Teagarden, who was referee for six matches at the 2007 USA Sevens, an event in the IRB Sevens World Series held in February 2007.)

Pool/standings 
The IRB setting for this tournament was that the matches were to be played between two pools from which the top 8 teams qualified for the Quarter finals and the team that finished at the bottom of the Division A pool was to be relegated to the Division B.
Pool A played against Pool D
Pool B played against Pool C

Match points were awarded on the basis of 4 points for a Win, 2 points for a draw and 0 points for a Loss. Bonus points were awarded for teams scoring 4 tries or more and to losing teams who lost be 7 points or less.

Division A

Pool A              

   
  
Pool B

Pool C

Pool D

New Zealand, Australia, South Africa and Wales qualified for the Division A semi-finals by virtue of having the highest points in the pool stage.

Pool A vs Pool D Results

Pool B vs Pool C Results

Division B
Pool A              

   
  
Pool B

Pool C

Pool D

Italy, Canada, Georgia and the USA qualified for the Division B semi-finals by virtue of having the highest points in the pool stage.

Pool A vs Pool D Results

Pool B vs Pool C Results

Knock out phase

Using the final positions from the pool phase the knock-out round 1 matches were made on the following basis:

 Match 1 – 10th versus 11th 
 Match 2 – 9th versus 12th
 Match 3 – 6th versus 7th 
 Match 4 – 5th versus 8th 
 Match 5 – 2nd versus 3rd (deemed a semi-final)
 Match 6 – 1st versus 4th (deemed a semi-final)

For round 2 of the knock out phase
 The loser of Match 1 plays the loser of Match 2 for 11th place
 The winner of Match 1 plays the winner of Match 2 for 9th place
 The loser of Match 3 plays the loser of Match 4 for 7th place
 The winner of Match 3 plays the winner of Match 4 for 5th place
 The loser of Match 5 plays the loser of Match 6 for 3rd place
 The winner of Match 5 plays the winner of Match 6 for 1st place (the final)

Division A

Round 1
{| class="wikitable"
|-border=1 cellpadding=5 cellspacing=0
!width="130"|Category
!width="130"|Date
!width="120"|Team
!width="55"|Score
!width="120"|Team
!width="180"|Venue
|-
|10th v 11th
| 17 April 2007, 17:30 
|
|7–11 
| 
|Belfast Harlequins, Belfast
|-
|9th v 12th 
|17 April 2007, 19:30 
|  
|31–10 
| 
|Shaw's Bridge, Belfast
|-
|6th v 7th 
|17 April 2007, 17:30 
| 
|31–13 
| 
|Shaw's Bridge, Belfast
|-
|5th v 8th 
|17 April 2007, 19:30 
| 
|25–13 
| 
|Belfast Harlequins, Belfast
|-
|2nd v 3rd 
|17 April 2007, 17:30 
| 
|18–32 
| 
|Ravenhill, Belfast
|-
|1st v 4th 
|17 April 2007, 19:30 
| 
|36–12 
| 
|Ravenhill, Belfast
|-
|}

Round 2 (Play-offs)
{| class="wikitable"
|-border=1 cellpadding=5 cellspacing=0
!width="130"|Category
!width="130"|Date
!width="120"|Team
!width="55"|Score
!width="120"|Team
!width="180"|Venue
|-
|11th Place Play-Off 
|21 April 2007, 15:30 
|
|60–12 
|
|Belfast Harlequins, Belfast
|-
|9th Place Play-Off 
|21 April 2007, 15:00 
| 
|0–34 
|  
|Ravenhill, Belfast
|-
|7th Place Play-Off 
|21 April 2007, 13:30 
| 
|12–13 
| 
|Shaw's Bridge, Belfast
|-
|5th Place Play-Off 
|21 April 2007, 15:30 
| 
|17–43 
| 
|Shaw's Bridge, Belfast
|-
|3rd Place Play-Off 
|21 April 2007, 17:30 
| 
|25–21 
| 
|Ravenhill, Belfast
|-
|Final 
|21 April 2007, 19:30 
| 
|7–31 
| 
|Ravenhill, Belfast
|-
|}

Division B

Round 1
{| class="wikitable"
|-border=1 cellpadding=5 cellspacing=0
!width="130"|Category
!width="130"|Date
!width="120"|Team
!width="55"|Score
!width="120"|Team
!width="180"|Venue
|-
|10th v 11th
|16 April 2007, 17:30
|
|10–35
|
|Queen's, Belfast 
|-
|9th v 12th 
|16 April 2007, 17:30
|
|14–22
|
|Malone, Belfast
|-
|6th v 7th 
|16 April 2007, 17:30
|
|21–3
|
|Bangor, Bangor
|-
|5th v 8th 
|16 April 2007, 19:30
|
|26–11 
| 
|Bangor, Bangor 
|-
|2nd v 3rd 
|16 April 2007, 19:30
| 
|19–3 
| 
|Malone, Belfast 
|-
|1st v 4th 
|16 April 2007, 19:30
| 
|31–6 
|
|Queen's, Belfast 
|-
|}

Round 2 (Play-offs)
{| class="wikitable"
|-border=1 cellpadding=5 cellspacing=0
!width="130"|Category
!width="130"|Date
!width="120"|Team
!width="55"|Score
!width="120"|Team
!width="180"|Venue
|-
|11th Place Play-Off 
|20 April 2007, 17:30 
|
|29–10 
|
|Malone, Belfast 
|-
|9th Place Play-Off
|20 April 2007, 17:30  
| 
|20–10 
|
|Queen's, Belfast
|-
|7th Place Play-Off 
|20 April 2007, 19:30 
| 
|10–12 
| 
|Malone, Belfast 
|-
|5th Place Play-Off 
|20 April 2007, 19:30 
|
|15–24 
| 
|Queen's, Belfast 
|-
|3rd Place Play-Off 
|20 April 2007, 18:00 
| 
|5–24 
|
|Bangor, Bangor 
|-
|Final 
|20 April 2007, 19:30
| 
|3–22 
|
|Shaw's Bridge, Belfast 
|-
|}

Semi-finals

Finals 

Therefore, New Zealand are the Under 19 Rugby World Champions for 2007 and Italy are promoted to Division A.

Final standings 
The final standings are based on the 3 pool matches plus a further 2 matches to determine standings.
 
{| class="wikitable"
|-border=1 cellpadding=5 cellspacing=0
!width="160"|Division A
!width="20"|Pos
!width="160"|Division B
|- 
|align=left|  
|1
|align=left|  *
|-
|align=left|  
|2
|align=left|  
|-
|align=left|  
|3
|align=left|  
|-
|align=left|  
|4
|align=left|  
|-
|align=left|  
|5
|align=left|  
|-
|align=left|  
|6
|align=left|  
|-
|align=left|  
|7
|align=left|  # 
|-
|align=left|  
|8
|align=left|  # 
|-
|align=left|  
|9
|align=left|  # 
|-
|align=left|  
|10
|align=left|  # 
|-
|align=left|  
|11
|align=left|  # 
|-
|align=left|  *
|12
|align=left|  #
|}

* Japan was initially demoted to Division B and Italy promoted to Division A for future World Championships. However, with the creation of the IRB Junior World Championship, both teams competed in its 2008 inaugural edition. This event featured all teams from the 2007 Division A, plus Italy, Canada, the US, and Tonga.

# Zimbabwe, Chile, Romania, Russia, Chinese Taipei and the Cook Islands were initially relegated from Division B and had to enter regional competitions to qualify for future World Championships. This did not change with the creation of the Junior World Championship and IRB Junior World Trophy; Georgia and Uruguay were given automatic berths to the 2008 IRB Junior World Trophy, while remaining nations had to play in regional qualifying for the remaining six berths.

Overall Stats

References

External links
 Official website

2007 rugby union tournaments for national teams
2007
International rugby union competitions hosted by Ireland
2006–07 in Irish rugby union
2007 in youth sport